Ui (pronounced ooo-eee) was an American post-rock/funk band based in New York City, which started in 1990. The group was started by Sasha Frere-Jones and Clem Waldmann. Wilbo Wright joined the group in 1993. The group's songs are often described as "bass-heavy", as the band frequently used two bass guitars. Other instruments used by the band include banjo, synthesizers, tuba and timpani. Their musical style is described to range between funk, dub, post-rock and electronica. The group had a high reliance on samplers and other studio equipment to overdub and articulate rhythms.  The group disbanded in 2003 shortly after the recording of the album Answers.

Discography

Full length
Sidelong (Southern, March 1996)
Lifelike (Southern, April 1998)
Answers (Southern, June 2003)

EPs and remixes
The 2-Sided EP (Hemiola, December 1993)
Unlike: Remixes Volume 1 (Lunamoth, November 1995), remixes of material from The 2-Sided EP and Sidelong
The Sharpie (Soul Static Sound, February 1996)
Match My Foot 7" (Soul Static Sound, February 1996)
Dropplike (Southern, August 1996), 3 remixes of songs from Sidelong
Fires as the group name "Uilab" (Bingo; Duophonic Records, February 1998), Ui and Stereolab collaborating on versions of "St Elmo's Fire" by Brian Eno
The Iron Apple (Southern, November 1999)

Ui have also remixed music for many groups, including Techno Animal and Microstoria.

References

External links
Official webpage (on Internet Archive)
UI at Discogs

American funk musical groups
American post-rock groups
Musical groups from New York City